Yavneh at Columbia is the Orthodox group of Hillel at Columbia University.  It consists of about 400 members and is part of the larger Hillel community which is the biggest community on Columbia campus.  Yavneh is responsible for programming ranging from daily minyanim to ski trips with the OCP (Orthodox Community at Penn) and everything in between.  As one of the biggest college and Ivy League Orthodox communities it is a major draw for many Orthodox students to Columbia University.

Programming
Programming is divided into four sections, Shabbas/chag, social, educational, and chessed.  Also, every semester (twice a year) there is a Yavneh end of semester dinner for students which gets a turnout of about 200 people.  The food in the past has been catered by many different kosher caterers and has been held in many different elegant rooms across campus including the James room at Barnard and in the Roone auditorium in Lerner.

Shabbas/Chag
The Shabbas schedule on campus begins with Friday night services at about candle lighting time continuing with Friday night dinner at Hewitt.   Frequently (about twice a month) there are Friday night parties or onegs scheduled and at 9pm there is a well-populated Tea and Torah program where people hang out and learn in the beis midrash while enjoying some tea, and other snacks.  In the morning, services are typically at 9:15 am and end about two hours later, followed by a dairy kiddush, at which people shmooze until lunch at Hewitt at 12:30.  Mincha services are held at about a half hour before sunset.  Mincha is followed by seudat shlisheet together with Koach, the Conservative group of Hillel.  Typical shalosh seudot food is served and singing continues until Maariv, at about nightfall. Shabbat is looked forward to as the one day each week you are forced to separate from class, work, and everything else and focus for 25 hours on friends, tefilla, Torah, food, and  Shabbas.

The Chagim are also unique experiences.  There are no minyanim for Rosh Hashanah nor for the first days of Succot and Pesach, but luckily there are shuls around the area that can suffice.  The davening schedule is similar to Shabbas for the Regalim.  Yom Kippur includes a pre and post fast meal.  The crowd varies during the day from 30 people to 100.  The chazanim are students and there typically is either a student or Rabbi who explains the service during the day.

Also, on Rosh Chodesh there are often chagigot which have included Gaga games and copious amounts of food.  Rosh Chodesh breakfast after davening has also been a popular addition.

Social
Social programming is variable from semester to semester and year to year but generally include many of the following elements.  In the fall semester for the past couple of years, there is a game run called assassins in which one team is given another team to kill.  Don't worry, killing are accomplished via water guns, water bottles, or any other water dispensing item.  Typically, once a semester there is at least one off-campus event like a Yankee game or Monster Truck Rally.  In the past there has been color war, capture the flag, lazertag, and other fun programs.
There are also many unofficial annual social events integrated into the fabric of the community, though not run by or funded by Yavneh Board. These include Ein Simcha, Busserfest, Be Cornholy, Highlighter Party, Paint Party, and a beer pong tournament.

Educational
Educational programming is an important part of a well balanced Orthodox life and is taken seriously at Yavneh.  Yavneh has been very privileged to have many weekly shiurim given by both Rabbis and recent graduates in smicha.  There has included a beginning shiur and two iyun shiurim in gemara, a couple weekly shiurim in tanach, and shiurim in philosophy and agaddah.  In addition WNLP a program in Hillel but not run by Yavneh runs a weekly chavruta program with snacks where both beginners and advanced learners congregate, eat, and learn chavruta style.

Besides regular shiurim, Yavneh has had the privilege of hosting great scholars and academics from many different places.  Rabbis from yeshivas in Israel coming to America to recruit often stop by to say hello to former students and give a guest shiur.  Yavneh has also had academics from Columbia give shiurim or talks about many different issues.

In 2008, Yavneh is planning a video showing of the movie Mekudeshet, which will hopefully be the start of a video series.

Chessed
Yavneh's chessed programming is an indispensable part of the experience at Columbia.  Yavneh has for many years run an extremely popular shabbaton with Yachad where Yachad members are put up in dorm rooms of Yavneh members all around campus and take part in the Shabbas experience at Columbia.  This Shabbas is chock full of programming with Yachad members in order to integrate them into the Yavneh community for Shabbas.

Besides the Yachad shabbaton, numerous Chessed events and projects are planned throughout each semester to raise awareness and funds and to allow students to take a break from their own classes and social lives to reach out to those who are in need.

Leadership
Yavneh is run by a group of six students, who comprise the Yavneh board.  One student is president of Yavneh, while the other five are vice presidents of   Shabbas/Chag, Social, Education, Chessed, and Communications.  The board is elected online by students on the Yavneh listserv at the end of the spring semester, and operates for the following Fall and Spring. The 2021-2022 Yavneh President is Lea Herzfeld, daughter of Rabbi Shmuel Herzfeld.

Additionally, there is a Yavneh Gabbinate that organizes prayer services. Gabbinate is composed of two gabbaim, who serve two year duties, and one gabbait, who serves for one year. Members of the Gabbinate have attended learned institutions in Israel and are dedicated to the organization of religious services on campus. Gabbinate is self-selected. They are responsible for replacing a gabbai and gabbait at the end of each fall semester, to begin service in the Spring.

Minyanim
Several Yavneh minyanim are available daily during the spring and fall semesters. During weekdays, morning services are held at 7:40 am on the fifth floor of the Kraft Center. Afternoon services are held at 4:10 pm on fifth floor of Kraft. Evening services are often held at 10:00 pm the fifth floor of Kraft - see the website for minyan times. On Shabbat, all minyanim, including Kabbalat Shabbat, Shacharit, and Mincha, are held in Rennert Hall.
 
Yavneh minyanim have traditionally been managed by a gabbai rishon, though he was often assisted by a gabbai sheni. Today, Yavneh's services are managed by a group of male and female students, nicknamed the"Gabbinate". The Gabbinate arranges minyan times an locations, gives out kibbudim, and collects tzedaka donated during services. Yavneh davening times can found at http://www.columbia.edu/cu/jsu/yavneh/minyan_times.shtml.

Secular United States universities and colleges with Orthodox Jewish organizations

References

External links
Yavneh Web Site
Minyan times,

Jewish organizations based in the United States
Student religious organizations in the United States